White River City is an  Unincorporated community along the White River and Piceance Creek in Rio Blanco County, Colorado, United States.

Description

The settlement was formerly incorporated in 1888 by brothers Reuben and Ambrose Oldman, in hope that a railroad would come through the area along White River. Ambrose was involved in oil speculation in the area and ran a store on Piceance Creek until 1895, when he moved to Meeker. There was a schoolhouse in 1902.

See also

 Colorow Mountain State Wildlife Area

References

External links

Populated places in Rio Blanco County, Colorado